Fassbender is a surname of German origin. It is a variant of the word Fassbinder, which means "cooper".

Notable people with the name include:

Hedwig Fassbender (born 1954), German mezzo-soprano and academic
Heike Fassbender, German mathematician
Joseph Fassbender (1903–1974), German painter and draughtsman
Jürgen Fassbender (born 1948), German tennis player
Max Fassbender (1868 – c. 1927), German cinematographer
Michael Fassbender (born 1977), Irish actor living in England
Peter Fassbender (born 1946), Canadian politician
Susan Fassbender (1959–1991), English singer, songwriter, and musician

See also
Rainer Werner Fassbinder, (1945–1982), German film director
Brigitte Fassbaender (born 1939), German opera singer and stage director
Willi Domgraf-Fassbaender (1897–1978), German opera singer, father of Brigitte

German-language surnames